Birgir Finnbogason (born 18 September 1948) is an Icelandic former handball player who competed in the 1972 Summer Olympics.

References

1948 births
Living people
Birgir Finnbogason
Birgir Finnbogason
Handball players at the 1972 Summer Olympics